Glenloch is a neighborhood of Peachtree City, Georgia, United States. The village is centered at South Peachtree Parkway and Windgate Road.

Populated places in Fayette County, Georgia